Attila Adorjany is a commercial illustrator, web designer and motiongraphics designer, creative consultant and a critically acclaimed comic book creator.

In September 2009 Attila began publishing Metaphysical Neuroma, an ongoing digital webcomic.

Career
Attila attended the Ontario Collage of Art and Design briefly before starting work in the TV and Film industry working for Warner Bros. and later branched out as Multimedia and Viral Advertising Flash developer and UX designer for Advertising agencies like BBDO and MArchFisrt Maclaren McCann in 2003 Attila Switch focus to Commercial illustration and began exploring Sequential art both as traditional and digital projects as well as began displaying works in contemporary galleries as a Vinyl toy artist which fused a variety of artistic disciplines Attila had developed in the film industry as a Robotics and prosthetics effects artist in his Studio Effects days and began emerging as contemporary gallery artist having works displayed in Fashionable galleries in Hong Kong, Bristol, New York and Los Angeles.  Attila continues to develop toys and limited edition art projects under the moniker "600poundgorilla" and "TILT".

Adorjany is known for his RPG fantasy illustrations and comic covers his work has also appeared in movie posters, CD art, trading cards, and concept work for film and video games.  He has also contributed to many national and international publications. His clients include Dragon Magazine, Wizards of the Coast, White Wolf Publishing, AEG, Warner Bros., Warner Music Canada, UDON, Green Ronin, EA Games, among others.

In 2008 Attila started publishing the acclaimed digital webcomic Metaphysical Neuroma.

Nominations and awards 
 2011, Contributing Artist, POPGUN vol. 4 Awarded, Harvey Award, Best Anthology.
 2011: Nominated, Shuster Award, Best Webcomic —, Metaphysical Neuroma
 2010: Nominated, Shuster Award, Best Webcomic—, Metaphysical Neuroma

References

External links 
 attilathe.com - Official Website
 Metaphysical Neuroma - Webcomic site
 600poundgorilla.com - Sculpture and Toywork site

1974 births
Artists from Toronto
Canadian comics artists
Canadian graphic designers
Canadian illustrators
Canadian speculative fiction artists
Fantasy artists
Living people
Role-playing game artists